Anna Millward, née Wilson, (born 26 November 1971) is an Australian cycle racer.  During her cycling career, she won the overall UCI points title in 2001, and twice was UCI overall World Cup points champion, winning a total of 5 World Cup races in her career. She also won two silver medals in the UCI Road World Championship competition in 1999 and twice won the Women's Challenge race (1996 and 2000).

In the 2000 Sydney Olympics she finished fourth in both the time trial and the road race. In the month after her home Olympics, on 18 October, she broke the UCI women's Hour record in Melbourne with a distance of 43.501 km. Millward had broken the hour record for the first time in 22 years, but she was to hold it for less than a month (Jeannie Longo rode 44.767 km in November 2000).

In the 1998 Commonwealth Games, she won gold in the time trial and bronze in the road race, she won a silver in the 2002 Commonwealth Games time trial.

In 2000, a portrait of her by Simon Benz was hung in the Archibald Prize.

Biography

Anna Millward (Wilson until her marriage in 2000) did not start out in life as an athlete. Instead, with the encouragement of her family, especially her father, who died when she was 11 years old, academics were given great emphasis in her upbringing. At that point in life, Millward concentrated on her youthful passion, the sciences. Later, at the urging of a teacher, she pursued a combined law and science degree at Monash University. The study of law gradually gained favor with her until she made it her primary study, eventually graduating with a degree in law in 1996.

It was also while attending university that she discovered her other passion - the bicycle. Initially riding a bicycle commuting to and from school, Millward and some friends decided to enter the Great Victorian Bike Ride, a nine-day recreational tour. Millward traces her passion for the bike to this tour.

Then in 1993, she decided to enter her first race, a lower grade event with her local club which she won. This marked the beginnings of an illustrious cycling career that would lead to many victories in prestigious events.

Palmarès

1996
1st A stage of the Tour of Majorca
6th Liberty Classic
1st Overall, Women's Challenge
1st Stage 5
2nd TT Stage
Olympic team member (Australia)
18th UCI World Points Rankings

1997
1st Overall, Street Skills
2 stage victories, Sprint and Points jerseys
1st  Australian National Time Trial Championships
2nd Australian National Road Race Championships

1998
Grande Boucle (Tour Cycliste Feminin)
1st Stage 6
14th Overall, Giro d'Italia Femminile (2.9.1)
1st Points Classification
1st Stage 4
1st Stage 7a
1st Stage 10
Women's Challenge
1st Boise to Idaho City Road Race
2nd Overall, Canberra Women's Cycling Classic (Tour de Snowy)
Winner stages 3 and 5
1st Queen of the Mountains classification
2nd Overall, Street Skills Stage Race
1st Stage 4
1st Discovery Channel Women's Cycling Classic
1st Stage 1
1st Stage 3
1st Stage 4
1st Time Trial, Commonwealth Games
3rd Road Race, Commonwealth Games

1999
2nd Time Trial, World Championships
2nd Road Race, World Championships
 1st  Overall UCI Women's Road World Cup
1st GP Tell World Cup (Switzerland)
1st Tour de Suisse Feminin Prologue
1st GP des Nations Time Trial
1st New York City Women's Challenge
3rd Beneden-Maas World Cup (Netherlands)
4th Overall, Red Zinger Classic
1st Stage 3
Superweek
1st Stage 7
Women's Challenge (2.9.1)
1st Stage 1
1st Points jersey
Montreal (Can) World Cup - 3rd place
Tour de l'Aude (2.9.1)
1st Stage 6A
1st Athens Twilight Criterium
2nd LeFleur Criterium
6th Overall, Tour of Willamette
1st Prologue
1st Stage 3
1st Stage 4
1st Overall, Boulder-Roubaix
1st Stage 1 (Criterium)
1st Overall, Sea Otter Classic
1st Stage 1
1st Stage 3
3rd Street Skills
Wine Country Classic
1st Graton Road Race
2nd Criterium Stage
1st Canberra (Aus) World Cup
5th Overall, Canberra Women's Cycling Classic (Tour de Snowy)
1st Stage 6

2000
Set World Hour Record - 43.5 km (since broken)
Olympic Games
4th Time Trial
4th Road Race
Thuringen-Rundfahrt (2.9.1) - 6th overall
Winner prologue and stage 1
1st OverallWomen's Challenge (2.9.1)
2nd Points Classification
3rd Mountains Classification
1st Stage 1
1st Stage 10
6th Overall, Tour de l'Aude (2.9.1)
1st Stage 6
1st  Australian National Road Race Championships
2nd Australian National Time Trial Championships
1st Canberra (Aus) World Cup
3rd Overall, Tour de Snowy (2.9.1)
1st Points Classification
1st Stage 2
1st Stage 6
1st Stage 7

2001
1st UCI World Points Rankings
1st Overall, UCI Women's Road World Cup
7th Time Trial World Championships
1st GP des Nations Time Trial (1.9.1)
6th Tour de Suisse Féminin (2.9.1)
1st Stage 1
1st Stage 2
1st Stage 3
7th GP Suisse Féminin (Swi) World Cup
3rd Trophée International (Fra) World Cup
Thüringen-Rundfahrt (2.9.1)
1st Prologue (Zeulenroda Time Trial, 6 km)
3rd Tour of Arlington (MA)
2nd Liberty Classic (USA) World Cup
Tour de l'Aude (2.9.1)
3rd Points classification
1st Prologue
1st Stage 5
1st Stage 6
1st Xcelerate Twilight (Athens, GA)
2nd La Flèche Wallonne (Bel) World Cup
2nd BMC Software Criterium (Austin, TX)
1st Overall, Sea Otter Classic (2.9.2)
1st Stage 1
1st Stage 3
1st Stage 4
1st Hamilton City (NZl) World Cup
1st Canberra (Aus) World Cup
4th Overall, Tour de Snowy (2.9.1)
1st Points classification
1st Stage 1
1st Stage 2
1st Stage 3

2002
2nd Time Trial, Commonwealth Games

References

External links 
Anna Wilson profile

1971 births
Living people
Australian female cyclists
Olympic cyclists of Australia
Commonwealth Games gold medallists for Australia
Commonwealth Games bronze medallists for Australia
Cyclists at the 1996 Summer Olympics
Cyclists at the 2000 Summer Olympics
Cyclists at the 1998 Commonwealth Games
Cyclists at the 2002 Commonwealth Games
Monash Law School alumni
Australian Institute of Sport cyclists
Sportswomen from Victoria (Australia)
Cyclists from Melbourne
Commonwealth Games medallists in cycling
Medallists at the 1998 Commonwealth Games
Medallists at the 2002 Commonwealth Games